Terellia pseudovirens is a species of tephritid or fruit flies in the genus Terellia of the family Tephritidae.

Distribution
Cyprus.

References

Tephritinae
Insects described in 1940
Diptera of Europe